The World Series of Soccer was a series of club games hosted by Major League Soccer from 2005 to 2007. It was used by MLS to provide its teams with opportunities to compete against top international teams.

Previous uses of name
The term, World Series of Soccer, was originally used for a series of senior international soccer matches hosted by the United States Soccer Federation between 1991 and 1994. In 2005, Major League Soccer re-introduced the name for a series of professional matches in the United States

2005
In 2005, Major League Soccer (MLS) began the World Series of Soccer (WSS), a series of games pitting MLS and big name international clubs against each other. The games took place across the United States. The WSS was a round robin style competition between two MLS teams: D.C. United and Chicago Fire as well as two European powerhouses: Chelsea of the English Premiership and Milan of Italy's Serie A. The games were played during the MLS season, the European off-season.

Results
July 24  Milan 0–1 Chelsea

July 27  Chicago Fire 1–3 Milan

July 28  D.C. United 1–2 Chelsea

July 31 Milan 1–1 Chelsea

2006
In 2006, MLS continued the WSS and expanded it to include Real Madrid and Barcelona from Spain, Celtic from Scotland, Everton from England and Club América, Necaxa and Tigres from Mexico.

Results
July 12  D.C. United 4–0 Celtic (Scotland)

July 12  Chicago Fire 1–2 Club América (Mexico)

July 12  Los Angeles Galaxy 0–1 Necaxa (Mexico)

July 19  New England Revolution 1–1 Celtic (Scotland)

July 19  FC Dallas 2–0 Tigres UANL (Mexico)

July 23  Chivas USA 1–1 (5–4 PK) Club América (Mexico)

July 26  Columbus Crew 1–1 Everton (England)

August 9  D.C. United 1–1 Real Madrid

August 12  New York Red Bulls 1–4 FC Barcelona (Spain)

August 12 Real Salt Lake 0–2 Real Madrid (Spain)

2007
The World Series of Soccer returned in 2007 as a four-team affair, primarily used to promote the arrival of English footballer David Beckham to the United States. His Los Angeles Galaxy had a round-robin with Chelsea of the Premier League, the Suwon Samsung Bluewings of the K League, and the UANL Tigres of the Primera División de México. UANL Tigres won the competition by virtue of goal difference over Chelsea.

Results
July 17 2:30 pm PDT Suwon Samsung Bluewings 0–1 Chelsea

July 17 5:30 pm PDT UANL Tigres 3–0 Los Angeles Galaxy

July 21 2:30 pm PDT UANL Tigres 3–0 Suwon Samsung Bluewings

July 21 5:30 pm PDT Chelsea 1–0 Los Angeles Galaxy

Major League Soccer
American soccer friendly trophies